Gölcük Spor Kulübü, commonly referred to as Gölcükspor, is a Turkish professional football club based in Gölcük, Kocaeli.The club was incepted in 1984 with the merger of Dumlupınar Youth Club's (Amateur Gölcükspor and Dumlupınar Youth Club).

History 
Football in 1984 3. Lig. The club, which was established under the name of "Gölcükgücü" before, could not change its name for 3 years as required by law and later it was renamed as Gölcükspor. The club did not change its main colors. Sports in Gölcük begins with the Naval Command and Shipyard Command in Gölcük since 1924. The first federated club in the district was founded in 1950 by Nurettin Saral, Remzi Dobrucalı, Sedat Kahyaoğlu, Nihat Akay, Fahrettin İlem.

This club started to compete in Kocaeli Amateur cluster as federated in 1950. Ercüment Kızıltan, Güngör Yüksel, Atty. Ömer Lütfü Özkes was named as "Gölcükspor" by Lütfü Takılgan, Mehmet Ancaza and Ali Fuat Kanpara in accordance with the regulations of Professional Kocaelispor

At the end of the 1983-84 Season, Dumlupınar Gençlik kulübünün (Amateur Gölcükspor and Dumlupınar Youth)  merged and joined the Professional 3rd League, which was re-established in the 1984/85 season as "Gölcükgücü".

At the end of the 1983-84 Season, Dumlupınar Gençlik kulübünün merged and joined the Professional 3. Lig, which was re-established in the 1984–85 season as "Gölcükgücü".

During the 1983-84 Season, Dumlupınar Youth changed the name while struggling in the away league, and although it remained Red-Black, its name became Gölcükgücü.

In the 1984–1985 season, in the first season of the 3. Lig, as a Champion, in the 1985–1986 season, they struggled in the 2. Lig (with the current name, the 1st League).

In 2018–19, the season started with Gölcükspor Kayhan Çubuklu, Mustafa Sert coached the club until 23rd week and after the 30th week, the team in the league was under the direction of Ali Beykoz . The club secured won 9 wins, 13 draws and 12 losses in 34 games. He finished his group 15th, collecting 40 points. Hüseyin Çardak was elected as the new chairman at the general assembly held after the end of the season. After the congress, the new management brought the former football player Taner Güller to coach the unit. After the first 14 weeks of the league, Taner Güller resigned from his post. Gölcükspor, which has 14 games under the management of Güller, featured 4 wins, 3 draws and 7 losses. At the end of 14 weeks, the team was 14th with 15 points. After Gulleri, Sadi Tekelioğlu was appointed as the coach of the team.

Gölcükspor, which has been competing in the 3. Lig in all remaining seasons except for 1 year since its establishment, is the team that competes the most in this League.

The club did not managed to participate in leagues between 1999-2001 due to the earthquake of August 17, 1999.

Current squad

Competitive record
 '1. Lig: 1 season  '
1985—1986
  '3. Lig: 32 seasons' 
1984–1985, 1986—present

Performances

References

Football clubs in Turkey
Association football clubs established in 1984
1984 establishments in Turkey